Pione vastifica, commonly known as red boring sponge, is a species of sponge found from the Red Sea to western Pacific Ocean.

References

Hadromerida